List of Slovenian composers, arranged in alphabetical order:

A 
France Ačko
Bojan Adamič
Emil Adamič
Jakob Aljaž
Alojz Ajdič
Milan Apih
Blaž Arnič
Slavko Avsenik
Slavko Avsenik mlajši

B 
Julije Bajamonti
Emerik Beran
Julij Betetto
Dušan Bavdek
Janez Bitenc
Emerik Beran
Janez Bole
Darijan Božič
Lojze Bratuž
Matija Bravničar
Lara Baruca

C 
Ciril Cvetko
Dragotin Cvetko
Zvonimir Ciglič

D 
Joannes Baptista Dolar

F 
Nenad Firšt
Nana Forte

G 
Jacobus Gallus
Fran Gerbič
Alojz Geržinič
Vinko Globokar
Jure Godler
Jani Golob
Rok Golob

H 
Milka Hartman
Stanko Horvat
Jože Humer

I 
Alojz Ipavec
Avgust Ipavec
Josip Ipavec
Gustav Ipavec
Benjamin Ipavec
Amandus Ivančič
Jure Ivanušič

J 
Tone Janša
Davorin Jenko

K 
Božidar Kantušer
Marij Kogoj
Marjan Kozina
Uroš Krek
Aleksander Kogoj

L 
Anton Lajovic
Marijan Lipovšek
Mihovil Logar

M 
Igor Majcen
Kašpar Mašek
Kamilo Mašek
Janez Matičič
Pavle Merku
Adolf Mišek

O 
Slavko Osterc

P 
Josip Pavčič
Jakob Petelin Gallus
Ivo Petrić
Isaac Posch (Izak Poš)
Stanko Prek
Zorko Prelovec
Stanko Premrl
Georg Prenner (tudi Pyrenaeus Brenner)
Jože Privšek

R 
Primož Ramovš
Janko Ravnik
Ivan Rijavec

S 
Milan Sachs
Risto Savin
Paul J. Sifler
Jurij Slatkonja
Anton Martin Slomšek
Igor Stuhec
Minja Subota

Š 
Nina Šenk
Lucijan Marija Škerjanc
Danilo Švara

T 
Giuseppe Tartini
Franc Treiber
Primož Trubar
Josipina Turnograjska

V 
Josip Vošnjak

Z 
Ivan Zorman

Ž 
Vito Žuraj

External links 
 

 
Slovenian
Composers